Wagner College is a private liberal arts college in Staten Island, New York City. Founded in 1883 and with an enrollment of approximately 2,200 students, Wagner is known for its academic program, The Wagner Plan for the Practical Liberal Arts. It is accredited by the Middle States Commission on Higher Education.

History 
Wagner College was founded in 1883 in Rochester, New York, as the Lutheran Proseminary of Rochester. Its purpose was to prepare young men for admission to Lutheran seminaries and to ensure that they were sufficiently fluent in both English and German to minister to the large German immigrant community of that day. The school's six-year curriculum (covering the high-school and junior-college years) was modeled on the German gymnasium curriculum. In 1886, the school was renamed Wagner Memorial Lutheran College, after a building in Rochester was purchased for its use by John G. Wagner in memory of his son.

The college moved to the 38-acre (15 ha) former Cunard estate on Grymes Hill, Staten Island, in 1918. An Italianate villa called Westwood, the Cunard mansion (circa 1851), is extant (now Cunard Hall), as is the neighboring former hotel annex that was built in 1905 (initially named North Hall, now called Reynolds House). The college soon expanded to 57 acres (23 ha) after it acquired the neighboring Jacob Vanderbilt estate in 1922. In the 1920s, the curriculum began to move toward an American-style liberal arts curriculum that was solidified when the state of New York granted the college degree-granting status in 1928. The college admitted women in 1933 and introduced graduate programs in 1951. The college expanded further when it purchased the W.G. Ward estate in 1949 (current site of Wagner College Stadium), and again in 1993, when the college acquired the adjacent property of the former Augustinian Academy, which has largely remained wooded green space and athletic fields. The college now occupies 105 acres (42 ha) on the hill and has commanding views of the New York Harbor, the Verrazzano Bridge, Downtown Brooklyn, and Lower Manhattan.

New York City Writers Conference 
From 1956 through the late 1960s, Wagner College was the home of the New York City Writers Conference, which brought some of the leading lights of the literary world to campus each summer. Instructors included Saul Bellow, Robert Lowell, Edward Albee, Kay Boyle and Kenneth Koch. From 1961 to 1963, while English professor Willard Maas directed the conference, it served as a training ground for poets of the New York School.

Maas himself was a significant figure in the New York avant-garde world of the 1950s and 1960s; Edward Albee used Maas and his wife, experimental filmmaker Marie Menken, as the models for his lead characters in the early masterwork, Who's Afraid of Virginia Woolf?

The Stanley Drama Award, which began as a prize given at the conclusion of the NYC Writers Conference, has provided encouragement for several notable playwrights, including: Terrence McNally for This Side of the Door (1962), an early version of "And Things that Go Bump in the Night"; Adrienne Kennedy for Funnyhouse of a Negro (1963); Lonne Elder III for an early version of Ceremonies in Dark Old Men (1965), and Jonathan Larson in 1993 for an early version of Rent.

Campus 

Prominent early buildings include Cunard Hall (ca. 1851); Reynolds House (1905); Kairos House (1918), a Craftsman Style cottage; and Main Hall (1930, restored 2012) and Parker Hall (1923), built in the Collegiate Gothic style. Main Hall provides classroom and office space and a theater auditorium. Parker Hall, first built as a dormitory, is used for faculty offices.

Two cottages built in the early 1920s provide administrative space for the college's Public Safety and Lifelong Learning offices.

Three dormitory facilities were constructed during the college's major building drive: Guild Hall (1951), Parker Towers (1964) and Harbor View Hall (1969), later complemented by Foundation Hall (2010), a residence hall for upperclassmen. About two-thirds of undergraduates live on campus.

Another dormitory building, Campus Hall (1957), now provides classroom and office space.

The Horrmann Library (1961) contains over 200,000 volumes and holds the collection and personal papers of poet Edwin Markham.

The Megerle Science Building and Spiro Hall were opened in 1968, followed by the Wagner Union in 1970.

Two building projects have expanded earlier structures. In 1999, a dramatic expansion of the 1951 Sutter Gymnasium created the modern Spiro Sports Center. And in 2002, a pair of Prairie Style cottages constructed around 1905 were refurbished and joined by a bridge building into Pape Admissions House.

Three substantial resources on the physical history of the Wagner College campus have been published:
Founding Faces & Places: An Illustrated History Of Wagner Memorial Lutheran College, 1869–1930," first published for Wagner College's 125th anniversary commemoration in 2008,
Wagner College Memories: A Photographic Remembrance of Grymes Hill" (2011), and
Wagner College History Tour," a three-part series published in the Winter 2015–2016, Fall 2016 and Summer 2017 issues of Wagner Magazine.

Rankings
Wagner College's ranking in the 2020 edition of Best Colleges by U.S. News & World Report is Regional Universities North, tied for #32.

Athletics 

Wagner College offers athletic scholarships and competes at the NCAA Division I level in all intercollegiate athletics. Football competes at the NCAA Division I FCS – formerly  I-AA – level.

Wagner is a member of the Northeast Conference. Men's varsity intercollegiate teams are fielded in 10 sports: baseball, basketball, cross country, football, golf, lacrosse, tennis, and track & field (indoor and outdoor) and men's water polo, which was established in fall 2016. Women's varsity intercollegiate teams are fielded in 14 sports: basketball, cross country, golf, lacrosse, soccer, softball, swimming & diving, tennis, track & field (indoor and outdoor), and water polo, in addition to three newly added sports in fencing (2016), triathlon (2018) and field hockey, which was reinstated in 2018 and will compete in 2019.

Walt Hameline, in 38 years (1982–present) as the director of athletics and 34 years as head football coach at Wagner (1981–2014), won the school's only National Championship with a 19–3 victory over the University of Dayton in the 1987 NCAA Division III Championship game (also known as the 1987 Stagg Bowl). He was named NCAA Division III Coach of the Year in 1987. During his 34-year coaching career, Hameline amassed an all-time record of 223–139–2 (.615) at Wagner College. Upon his retirement as head football coach following the 2014 regular season, those 223 victories ranked fifth among active head Football Championship Subdivision head coaches and remains in the top 10 among all Division I-FCS coaches in the United States.

Notable Wagner sports coaches of the past include former Seton Hall University, NBA head coach and current TV analyst P.J. Carlesimo (head basketball coach 1976–1982), former Marquette University and Wagner head coach Mike Deane, Jim Lee Howell (head football coach 1947–1953), and current University of Florida head football coach Dan Mullen (assistant football coach 1994–1995). In 2019, two NFL coaches who had previously been Wagner assistant coaches were elevated to defensive coordinator positions. Lou Anarumo now heads the Cincinnati Bengals' defense, while Patrick Graham was formerly defensive coordinator for the Miami Dolphins.

The football team's home venue is Hameline Field (designated in 2012) at Wagner College Stadium, while the basketball teams play their home games in the Spiro Sports Center's Sutter Gymnasium.

Six of Wagner's student athletes have been NEC Student-Athlete of the Year winners (2013–2018).

Photos

Notable alumni 

Lou Anarumo, defensive coordinator for the NFL's Cincinnati Bengals
Tiffany Andrade, Miss New Jersey USA 2008 and 2nd runner-up at Miss USA 2008
Dawn Aponte, American football executive
Rocco Armento, an American sculptor, painter, and member of the NO!art movement
Andrew Bailey, former MLB All-Star pitcher, current bullpen coach for San Francisco Giants
Francis P. Baldwin, former Exxon Chief Scientist noted for his work on chemical modifications of low functionality elastomers.
Richard Baratta, film production manager known for his work on the 2002 Spider-Man film series, The Taking of Pelham 123, and Across the Universe
Scott Barnhardt, actor, original cast of Broadway's "Book of Mormon"
Bob Beckel, political commentator and analyst on the Fox News Channel
Peter L. Berger, sociologist and theologian
Jedediah Bila, author and political pundit
Curt Blefary, pro baseball left fielder
Alex Boniello, actor, with Broadway credits including Deaf West's Spring Awakening and Dear Evan Hansen
Kathy Brier, actor
Edward Burke, Staten Island deputy borough president (2006–present)
Molly Burnett, star of Days of Our Lives and Queen of the South
Lillian G. Burry, politician
Richie Byrne, comedian
Tim Capstraw, Brooklyn Nets Radio announcer and former Wagner Men's Basketball and Baseball coach
Jim Carroll, American author, poet, autobiographer, and punk musician
Brad Corbett, owner of Texas Rangers, 1974–1980
Edwin-Michael Cortez, library and information science dean
Piotr Czech, former NFL kicker
Christina DeCicco, actor
Damien Demento (Phil Theis), wrestler
John "Pat" Dugan, founder of Charity Navigator
Fred Espenak, NASA astronomer
Claire Fagin, nurse educator, pioneer of family-centered care, first female president of an Ivy League university
Vincent A. Fischetti, microbiologist, past editor of Infection and Immunity
Carmine Giovinazzo, actor (CSI: NY)
Allan L. Goldstein, an authority on the thymus gland and the workings of the immune system
Randy Graff, actor, Tony Award winner for Best Featured Actress in a Musical
Betsy Joslyn, actor, with Broadway credits including "Into the Woods," "Sweeney Todd," "Les Miz"
Friedrich Katz, anthropologist and historian
Rich Kotite, former NFL head coach (Philadelphia Eagles and New York Jets)
Janine LaManna, nominee for Drama Desk Award for Outstanding Featured Actress in a Musical, for Seussical
Kurt Landgraf, president of Washington College
Robert Litzenberger, professor emeritus at the University of Pennsylvania
Robert Loggia, actor
Frank Lombardi, executive producer of TV series "The Nanny" and other projects with Fran Drescher
Alicia Luciano, Miss New Jersey 2002
Donna Lupardo, member of the New York State Assembly
Gerard Malanga, poet and Andy Warhol collaborator
Nicole Malliotakis, member of the United States House of Representatives from New York's 11th congressional district
Arno Minkkinen, Finnish-American photographer
Kenneth Mitchell, politician, executive director of the Staten Island Zoo
Guy Molinari, former borough president of Staten Island; former member of the United States Congress
Dan Mullen, head football coach at University of Florida
Amy Polumbo, former Miss New Jersey (2007–2008)
Carl-Olivier Primé, Canadian football player
Greg Senat, NFL football player
Brian Sgambati, actor
Bret Shuford, actor
Julian Stanford, NFL linebacker for the Buffalo Bills
Cam Gill, NFL linebacker and Super Bowl Winner for the Tampa Bay Buccaneers
Olivia Brewer Stapp, American opera singer
Lynne Stewart, civil rights lawyer
Philip S. Straniere, civil court judge
Robert Straniere, former member of New York State Assembly
Michael Tadross, film producer
Armin Thurnher, journalist, co-editor of Vienna weekly news magazine Falter
Les R. Trautmann, editor of the Staten Island Advance from 1965 until his death in 1992
Gustave W. Weber, president of Susquehanna University, 1959–1977
Beverly Hoehne Whipple, sexologist, co-author of The G Spot and Other Recent Discoveries About Human Sexuality
Brian Whitman, radio talk show host
Paul Zindel, author and playwright

Filming location 
Wagner's campus has been featured in several films, television-show episodes, and advertisements. Shoot dates (where shown) are from Wagner College location contracts on file on campus:

"Silent Madness," 1984 film
"Naked in New York," 1993 film
"Cadaverous," 2000 short film
"The Sopranos," Ep. 39, "Army of One," 2001. Wagner College was used for the Hudson Military Institute campus.
"The Education of Max Bickford," 2001. CBS drama series starring Richard Dreyfuss and Marcia Gay Harden. Wagner College (along with Brooklyn College) was the fictional Chadwick College.
"School of Rock," 2003 film starring Jack Black and Joan Cusack. The Horace Green School exterior portrayed in the movie is Wagner College's Main Hall.
"Poster Boy," 2004 film which won the Outfest Grand Jury Award for Best Screenwriting.
"Four Lane Highway," 2005 film (shot on campus April 18, 2004)
"Exposing the Order of the Serpentine," 2006 film (shot on campus Jan. 5–6, 2005)
"Illegal Tender," 2007 film (shot on campus May 25–26, 2006)
"The Visitor," 2007 film distributed by Overture Films (shot on campus Oct. 9, 2006)
"Comedy Central on Campus: Starring Christian Finnegan" (shot on campus Dec. 6, 2006)
"Little New York" (orig. title "Staten Island)"), 2009 independent film starring Ethan Hawke and Vincent D'Onofrio (shot on campus May 2 and June 8, 2007)
"Rescue Me," TV series, "Play" (S5, E7, 2009) (shot on campus July 11, 2008)
"Law & Order: Special Victims Unit," TV series, "Swing" (S10, E3, 2008) (shot on campus Sept. 4–9, 2008)
"Law & Order: Special Victims Unit," TV series, "Lunacy" (S10, E4, 2008) (shot on campus Sept. 4–9, 2008)
"An Invisible Sign," 2010 film (shot on campus July 18–19, 2009)
"You Don't Know Jack," 2010 made-for-TV biopic (shot on campus Sept. 17–21, 2009)
"AmeriQua" (also titled "Eurotrapped"), a 2013 film featuring Alessandra Mastronardi (shot on campus Dec. 4, 2010)
"Law & Order: Special Victims Unit," TV series, "Gridiron Soldier" (S15, E16, 2014) (shot on campus March 5, 2014)
"The Rewrite," 2014 film starring Hugh Grant and Marisa Tomei (shot on campus 2013)
"Mayhem: We're Going to the Playoffs!" Allstate TV ad (shot on campus Aug. 27, 2016)
"Crashing," HBO series, "NACA" (S2, E7, 2018) (shot on campus Aug. 11, 2017)
"Jimmy," Clear biometric ID system commercial (2019) (shot on campus Aug. 25 & 26, 2018)
"Bull," CBS TV series, "Behind the Ivy" (S4, E12, 2020). Filmed on campus November 18, 2019.
"The King of Staten Island" (2020), loosely biographical film based on life of film's lead, Pete Davidson, directed by Judd Apatow. Filmed on campus June 10–17, 2019.

References

External links 

 
 Wagner Athletics website

 
1883 establishments in New York (state)
Educational institutions established in 1883
Liberal arts colleges in New York (state)
Lutheranism in New York (state)
Private universities and colleges in New York City
Universities and colleges in Staten Island
Grymes Hill, Staten Island